Cobar Shire is a local government area in the Orana region of New South Wales, Australia. The Shire is located in an outback area that is centred around the mining town of Cobar. The Shire is traversed by the Barrier Highway and the Kidman Way.

Lilliane Brady  was the Mayor of Cobar Shire for more than 20 years, before her death in 2021. At the time of her death, she was the longest-serving female mayor in New South Wales' history.

The current Mayor of Cobar Shire Council is Cr. Peter Abbott, an independent politician.

Villages and localities

The shire also includes several small outback towns and localities; the twin villages of Euabalong and Euabalong West in the far south east of the shire, Mount Hope, Nymagee and Irymple.

Demographics

According to the Australian Bureau of Statistics during 2003-04 there:
 were 1,898 wage and salary earners (ranked 116th in New South Wales and 376th in Australia, less than 0.1% of both New South Wales's 2,558,415 and Australia's 7,831,856)
 was a total income of $79 million (ranked 108th in New South Wales and 359th in Australia, less than 0.1% of both New South Wales's $107 billion and Australia's $304 billion)
 was an estimated average income per wage and salary earner of $41,386 (ranked 27th in New South Wales and 85th in Australia, 100% of New South Wales's $41,407 and 107% of Australia's $38,820)
 was an estimated median income per wage and salary earner of $36,856 (ranked 27th in New South Wales and 81st in Australia, 104% of New South Wales's $35,479 and 108% of Australia's $34,149).

Council

Current composition and election method
Cobar Shire Council is composed of twelve Councillors elected proportionally as a single ward. All Councillors are elected for a fixed four-year term of office. The Mayor is elected by the Councillors at the first meeting of the council. The most recent election was held on 4 December 2021. Only eleven candidates nominated for election, and with there being no additional candidates, the election was uncontested. A by-election was held on 26 February 2022 for the remaining seat. The makeup of the council is as follows:

The current Council, elected in 2021, in order of election, is:

References

 
Local government areas of New South Wales
1884 establishments in Australia
Populated places established in 1884